Alexey Kolessov (born September 27, 1984) is a Kazakhstani professional road bicycle racer. He competed in the men's points race at the 2004 Summer Olympics.

Major results

2004
 Tour of Azerbaijan – 1 stage & GC
2005
 Tour de l'Avenir – 3rd, stages 6 & 7
 4th, Kazakhstan Time Trial Championship

References

External links 

Kazakhstani male cyclists
1984 births
Living people
Tour of Azerbaijan (Iran) winners
Olympic cyclists of Kazakhstan
Cyclists at the 2004 Summer Olympics
20th-century Kazakhstani people
21st-century Kazakhstani people